Proximity search may refer to:
 Proximity search (text)
 Proximity search (metric space)